Shuttle hurdle relay (SHR) is a type of a relay race in track and field in which participants jump (sprint) over hurdles. The shuttle hurdle relay is contested at the Drake Relays, Kansas Relays, Mt. SAC Relays, Penn Relays, Texas Relays, Akron Relays, Alabama Relay, Appalachian Conference Relay, Florida Relays (Gainesville), Knoxville Relay, Long Beach Relay, Santa Barbara Relay, Tennessee Relays (formerly: Dogwood Relays, Sea Ray Relays), Towson Relays, and Tri-State Relays. The SHR was also included at the 2019 IAAF World Relays and 2021 competition.

High Hurdle Relay

Currently the SHR is referred to as the 4 x 60 Hurdles, 4 x 80 Hurdles, 4 x 100 Hurdles, and 4 x 110 Hurdles.   In the past the term shuttle hurdle relay was more commonly used.

This events allow four hurdlers to run on the same relay team and has been held both outdoor and indoor. In a shuttle hurdle relay, each of four hurdlers on a team runs the opposite direction from the preceding runner.

The shuttle hurdle relay typically consists of: (a) four hurdlers per relay team – each runs one leg, (b) same sex, (c) each hurdler runs the same hurdle spacing and hurdle heights,  (d) two lanes – one up, and one back (e) the first leg starts at the automatic timing line, hence this allows the anchor leg to finish at the "finish line", (f) hurdlers must stay in their own lane,  (g) hurdlers are not allowed to touch the hurdles with their hands, (h) depending on the age-group there may be an "exchange zone" (Masters Track and Field does not use an exchange zone),  (i) No batons are used for this particular relay, and (j) For Masters Track and Field the youngest person on the relay team dictates the age-bracket (for that particular relay team).

USATF Competition Rules list description for the Open and Masters shuttle hurdle relay competition.

History
1910-1911: Official Handbook of the Girls' Branch of the Public Schools Athletic League states for the girls hurdle relay "the maximum distance for each runner not to exceed fifty yards; the maximum height for hurdles to be two feet".

June 11, 1910 a girls hurdle relay was held at the Armory in Rochester, NY.

1920: Inter-varsity: Cambridge versus Oxford: Dec 1920: Oxford beat Cambridge in the SHR. Winning time of 67 2/5 seconds.   December 1921 Oxford beat Cambridge in 69 4/5 seconds.  December 1922 Oxford beat Cambridge in 67 2/5 seconds.

1924 and 1928 British Empire versus the USA in the SHR was held at Stamford Bridge, London. July 1924 USA beat British Empire in 61.6 seconds for the 480 yards hurdle relay.  1928: USA beating British Empire in 62 seconds.  and.

1926 the SHR was added to the Penn Relays events at the suggestion Lord Burghley (UK's Olympic hurdler).

In April 1938, Oklahoma State set a (then) Kansas Relays meet record in 1:01.6. 

March 1953 in California, the SHR was included at the Orange Show Relay and the four-way spike meet (four colleges).

1973 a West German team placed 3rd at the Mt Sac Relays in 59.1.

Masters Track and Field have included the SHR as a standard event at the USATF Masters Outdoor Championships. The competition is eligible for Masters American Records and medals. The oldest athlete that has competed in a SHR is George Roudebush (age 93) when he competed in a 2018 M80 plus SHR race. 

The oldest female athletes that have competed in a SHR are Tami Graf (age 85) at the 2021 and Flo Meiler (age 88) at the 2022 USATF Masters Outdoor Championships.

The "high hurdles" are also referred to "sprint hurdles" to separate them from the "long hurdles."

The Shuttle hurdle relay was also included at former relays such as the California Relays, Compton Relays, West Coast Relays, the 1996 Alabama Relays, and the Golden Valley Conference Relays   Additional relays include the 1993 European Relays in Portsmouth, England, and July 5, 1981 TAC Relay Championship in Greenvale, NY.

Including a SHR outside of the US and the United Kingdom has been infrequent. August 2007 BAUHAUS-galan (formerly GN Galan) meet in Stockholm, Sweden included the 480 Yard Shuttle Hurdle Relay.  USA 53.36 in 1st, Sweden 57.03 in 2nd, and Finland 57.26 in 3rd. The event was well received.

The 1990 Penn Relay included a 880 shuttle hurdle relay.

Mile intermediate hurdle relay

In the past, a rarely run 4 x 440 yard shuttle hurdle relay was included at some competitions.  A height of 36” tall hurdles is used.  April 29, 1972 Olivett College (John McGlashen, Charles VanderRoest, Bruce Ritter, and Ron Hobday) beat Cedarville in 3:58.4 for the mile intermediate hurdle at the Tri-State Relays, held at Defiance College.  Cedarville College (Cole, Alexander, Perkins, and Gruber) placing second took six seconds off their own school record.

April 1973, Edinboro State at the Akron Invitational Relays, Akron, Ohio broke the record for this event.  On April 6, 1974 Occidental College broke the 1973 record in the 4 x 440 yard shuttle hurdle relay in a meet against Whittier College and Pomona-Pitzer. April 17, 1974 Stanford broke Occidental College’s record while defeating Skyline College. March 15, 1975 Occidental College gained the record back.  April 24, 1976 Mt Sac College broke the record at the Mt. SAC Relays,  and on April 23, 1977 Pasadena broke the record at the Mt. SAC Relays.   By 1984, Long Beach City College (Jose Davis, Tyrone McCullough, Nelson Rodriguez, and Oswaldo Zea) held the community college 1600 meter intermediate hurdle relay in 3:31.06.

All-time top 20

Men - 4 × 110m
Updated November 2020

y = adjusted from the slightly shorter distance of 4 x 120 yards by adding 0.13 seconds

Women - 4 × 100m

Mixed
Updated August 2021

See also
 List of world records in athletics

Reference: The Hurdler's Bible
  00. The Hurdler's Bible 2 by Wilbur L. Ross and Norma Hernandez de Ross, PH.D.  Copyrighted 1966, 1978, and 1997.

References

External links 
Track and Field News and USATF websites include current shuttle hurdle relay American Records for the following:
 Open Men's SHR Record
 Open Women's SHR Record
 College Men's SHR Record
 College Women's SHR Record
 Jr College Men's SHR Record
 Jr College Women's SHR Record - - -
 HS Boys SHR Record
 HS Girls SHR Record
 Masters Track and Field SHR Records

Additional External Links:
 Shuttle hurdle relay website
 Woodhurdles website
 USATF Competition Rules
 Facebook
 Masters Track and Field: Shuttle hurdle relay Records
 Great Hurdlers website
 Iowa High School Rules
 North West Track and Field website
 Hurdles 101 website

Athletics (track and field) competitions
Track relay races
 
Running by type
Athletics by type
Jumping sports
World Championships
Events in track and field
American male hurdlers
American female hurdlers